Danvers is a city in Swift County, Minnesota, United States. The population was 97 at the 2010 census.  The community is named after Danvers, Massachusetts.

History
A post office called Danvers has been in operation since 1892. Danvers had a depot on the railroad.

Geography

U.S. Route 12 serves as a main route in the community.

Demographics

2010 census
As of the census of 2010, there were 97 people, 40 households, and 28 families living in the city. The racial makeup of the city was 97.9% White, 1.0% from other races, and 1.0% from two or more races. Hispanic or Latino of any race were 1.0% of the population.

There were 40 households, of which 35.0% had children under the age of 18 living with them, 57.5% were married couples living together, 2.5% had a female householder with no husband present, 10.0% had a male householder with no wife present, and 30.0% were non-families. 25.0% of all households were made up of individuals, and 15% had someone living alone who was 65 years of age or older. The average household size was 2.43 and the average family size was 2.86.

The median age in the city was 41.5 years. 25.8% of residents were under the age of 18; 6.1% were between the ages of 18 and 24; 24.8% were from 25 to 44; 28.8% were from 45 to 64; and 14.4% were 65 years of age or older. The gender makeup of the city was 52.6% male and 47.4% female.

2000 census
As of the census of 2000, there were 108 people, 43 households, and 31 families living in the city. The racial makeup of the city was 100.00% White.

There were 43 households, out of which 37.2% had children under the age of 18 living with them, 65.1% were married couples living together, 2.3% had a female householder with no husband present, and 27.9% were non-families. 23.3% of all households were made up of individuals, and 16.3% had someone living alone who was 65 years of age or older. The average household size was 2.51 and the average family size was 3.00.

In the city, the population was spread out, with 28.7% under the age of 18, 6.5% from 18 to 24, 24.1% from 25 to 44, 25.0% from 45 to 64, and 15.7% who were 65 years of age or older. The median age was 39 years. For every 100 females, there were 100.0 males. For every 100 females age 18 and over, there were 87.8 males.

The median income for a household in the city was $44,000, and the median income for a family was $45,938. Males had a median income of $38,000 versus $20,313 for females. The per capita income for the city was $23,452. There were no families and 4.7% of the population living below the poverty line, including no under eighteens and 23.5% of those over 64.

References

Cities in Minnesota
Cities in Swift County, Minnesota